Peshkin is a surname. Notable people with the surname include: 

Alan Peshkin (1931–2000), American educationalist
Leonid Peshkin (born 1970), American computer scientist